The flag of Baruta Municipality is yellow, green, and blue.  It was designed by Yoana Carolina Martínez.

References

See also
Anthem of the Baruta Municipality

Baruta Municipality
Flags of Venezuela